Gilbert Annette (born 10 March 1946) is a Malagasy politician. He represented Réunion in the French National Assembly from 1993-1997  and has been the Mayor of Saint-Denis, Réunion between 2008 and 2020.

Career
Annette is a member of the Socialist Party. He became a member of the Départemental Council in 1983 and a member of the Regional Council in 1988.  He was the Mayor of Saint-Denis, Réunion from 1989–1994 and was reelected in 2008.

He was a Deputy from  1993-1997 and was convicted for corruption in 1996.  He was sentenced to 5 years of deprivation of his civil rights, a 200.000 FRF (30.000 €) fine and 30 months in prison.  Since 2004 he has been the 1st secretary of the socialist federation of Reunion.  He was re-elected mayor of Saint-Denis, Réunion in 2008 with 53,83% of the votes.

References

1946 births
Living people
People from Antsiranana
Malagasy politicians
Socialist Party (France) politicians
Deputies of the 10th National Assembly of the French Fifth Republic
Mayors of places in Réunion
Black French politicians
French politicians convicted of corruption
Members of Parliament for Réunion